Genome refers to a complex biochemical system devised within living organisms to ensure their ability to vigorously survive by reproduction, which is usually directed in coded fashion by DNA, the key molecule of that system.

Genome may also refer to:
Human genome
Bovine genome
Mitochondrial genome
 BBC Genome Project, a digitised searchable database of programme listings from the Radio Times from the first issue in 1923, to 2009
 Genome (book), 1999 nonfiction book by Matt Ridley
 Genome (novel), science fiction novel by Sergey Lukyanenko
 Genome (journal), a scientific journal
 G-Nome, a PC game developed by 7th Level
 Genome, a superior humanoid race in Square's console role-playing game Final Fantasy IX
 Chromosome (genetic algorithm), the parameter set of a proposed solution to a problem posed to a genetic algorithm
 Lord Genome, a character from the anime series Tengen Toppa Gurren Lagann
 The Wild Health Genomes, a professional baseball team based in Lexington, Kentucky

See also
Genome size
Genome project
Genomics

:Category:Genome projects